Talbert is a surname of Germanic origin. It is recorded in Scotland in the 16th century. The name refers to:

Ansel Talbert (b. unknown, d. 1987), American aviation journalist
Bill Talbert (1918–1999), American professional tennis player
Bruce James Talbert (1838-1881), British architect and interior designer
David E. Talbert (contemporary), American playwright
Diron Talbert (b. 1944), American professional football player
Don Talbert (b. 1939), American professional football player
Florence Cole Talbert (1890–1961), American operatic soprano
Mary Burnett Talbert (1866–1923), American suffragist and reformer
Michel Talbert, pseudonym of French poet and fantasy writer Michel Bernanos (1923–1964)
Richard Talbert (b. 1947), British-American historian, classicist, and professor
Robert M. Talbert, American politician from Missouri
W. Jasper Talbert (1846–1931), American politician from South Carolina; U.S. representative 1893–1903
B.Sevyn Talbert,(b. 1990), American Film Producer, writer and actor